The Roman Catholic Archdiocese of Medellín is an archdiocese located in the city of Medellín in Colombia.

Archbishop Ricardo Antonio Tobón Restrepo is the current archbishop of Medellín.

History
14 February 1868: Established as Diocese of Medellín from the Diocese of Antioquía
24 February 1902: Promoted as Metropolitan Archdiocese of Medellín

Special churches
Minor Basilicas:
Basílica de Nuestra Señora del Rosario de Chiquinquirá, La Estrella
Nuestra Señora de la Candelaria, Medellín
Medellín cathedral is also a minor basilica.

Bishops and Metropolitan Archbishops of Medellín

Other affiliated bishops

Coadjutor bishops
José Joaquín Isaza Ruiz (1869-1873)
Tiberio de Jesús Salazar y Herrera (1932-1937)
Alfonso López Trujillo (1978-1979); future Cardinal

Auxiliary bishops
Francesco Saverio Zaldúa (1882); did not take effect
Mosé Higuera (1884-1915)
Buenaventura Jáuregui Prieto (1951-1957), appointed Bishop of Zipaquirá
Miguel Antonio Medina y Medina (1959-1964), appointed Bishop of Montería
Octavio Betancourt Arango (1970-1975), appointed Bishop of Garzón
Rodrigo Arango Velásquez, P.S.S. (1981-1985), appointed Bishop of Buga
Fabio Betancur Tirado (1982-1984), appointed Bishop of La Dorada-Guaduas
José Roberto López Londoño (1982-1987), appointed Bishop of Armenia
Abraham Escudero Montoya (1986-1990), appointed Bishop of Espinal
Carlos Prada Sanmiguel (1988-1994), appointed Bishop of Duitama-Sogamoso
Tulio Duque Gutiérrez, S.D.S. (1993-1997), appointed Bishop of Apartadó
Darío de Jesús Monsalve Mejía (1993-2001), appointed Bishop of Málaga-Soatá
Orlando Antonio Corrales García (1998-2001), appointed Bishop of Palmira
Gonzalo de Jesús Rivera Gómez (1998-2010)
Jorge Iván Castaño Rubio, C.M.F. (2001-2010)
Gilberto Jiménez Narváez (2001-2012)
Víctor Manuel Ochoa Cadavid (2006-2011), appointed Bishop of Málaga-Soatá
Edgar Aristizábal Quintero (2011-2017), appointed Bishop of Yopal
Hugo Alberto Torres Marín (2011-2015), appointed Bishop of Apartadó
Elkin Fernando Álvarez Botero (2012-
José Mauricio Vélez García (2017-

Other priests of this diocese who became bishops
Manuel Antonio López de Mesa, appointed Bishop of Antioquía in 1902
Emilio Botero González, appointed Bishop of Pasto in 1947
Guillermo Escobar Vélez, appointed Auxiliary Bishop of Antioquía in 1952
Alfonso Uribe Jaramillo, appointed Auxiliary Bishop of Cartagena in 1963
Gonzalo Restrepo Restrepo, appointed Auxiliary Bishop of Cali in 2003
Fidel León Cadavid Marin (priest here, 1976-1988), appointed Bishop of Quibdó in 2011
Luis Fernando Rodríguez Velásquez, appointed Auxiliary Bishop of Cali in 2014
Luis Albeiro Maldonado Monsalve, appointed Bishop of Mocoa-Sibundoy in 2015

Suffragan dioceses
Caldas
Girardota
Jericó
Sonsón – Rionegro

See also
Roman Catholicism in Colombia

References

External links
 Catholic Hierarchy
 GCatholic.org

Roman Catholic dioceses in Colombia
Roman Catholic Ecclesiastical Province of Medellín
Religious organizations established in 1868
Medellín
Roman Catholic dioceses and prelatures established in the 19th century
1868 establishments in Colombia